The Junior women's race at the 2017 IAAF World Cross Country Championships was held at the Kampala in Uganda, on March 26, 2017.

The exact length of the course was 5,858 m (33m start, 2 full laps of 2,000 m and a final lap of 1,825m).

Complete results for individuals.

Race results

Junior women's race (6 km)

Individual

Teams

Note: Athletes in parentheses did not score for the team result.

See also
 2017 IAAF World Cross Country Championships – Junior men's race
 2017 IAAF World Cross Country Championships – Senior men's race
 2017 IAAF World Cross Country Championships – Senior women's race
 2017 IAAF World Cross Country Championships – Mixed relay

References

Junior women's race at the World Athletics Cross Country Championships
2017 IAAF World Cross Country Championships